The French Civil Service is the set of civil servants (fonctionnaires) working for the Government of France.

Not all employees of the state and public institutions or corporations are civil servants; however, the media often incorrectly equate "government employee" or "employee of a public corporation" with fonctionnaire. For instance, most employees of the RATP and SNCF (metropolitan and national rail transport authorities) are not civil servants. The Civil Service is also sometimes incorrectly referred to as the administration, but, properly speaking, the administration is the compound of public administrations and public administrative establishments, not their employees.

Most employment positions in the French civil service are open to citizens of the European Union. Others, especially in police and justice, are specifically reserved for nationals, while a minority are open regardless of citizenship. About half of the civil servants are employed in the French public education system.

Divisions
The Civil Service is divided into:
 the civil service of the State (fonction publique de l'État);
 the judiciary (magistrature);
 the civil service of public hospitals (fonction publique hospitalière);
 the civil service of local governments (fonction publique territoriale).

Technically, fonction publique may also refer to fonction publique militaire, the personnel of military status. They are generally counted apart. There also exist ouvriers d'État - that is, State Workers - for industrial functions.

Corps and ranks
Civil servants of the State are divided into corps ("professions"). Corps are grouped in 3 categories (formerly 4): category A for management, design, and general studies professions (e.g. judges, engineers, professors...); category B for applications-related professions (e.g. librarians, superior technicians...); and category C for executions-related professions (e.g. technicians, administrative assistants, law enforcement officers...). Each corps has a set of possible job or task descriptions and may have its own particular statutes.

These corps may themselves be divided into ranks (grades, called classes in certain corps). For instance, the corps of university professors is a category A corps divided into 3 classes: second class (equivalent to an American associate professor), first class (full professor), exceptional class (leading full professor in his area). Generally, to avoid rank inflation, the number of civil servants in the higher ranks (especially "exceptional class") is constrained by a maximal percentage of the total number of civil servants of the corps.

Other French Civil Services have different organisations; for instance the Fonction Publique Territoriale is not divided between rigid "corps" but between "cadres d'emploi" (type of job).

Grands corps de l'État 

Certain corps enjoying particular prestige are called the "grands corps de l'État":

 Grand Technical Corps of the State, consisting of engineers, generally recruited at École polytechnique (also at the écoles normales supérieures). In practice, they are more likely to be employed in executive positions than in purely technical positions.
 Corps des mines, merged with the Corps of Telecommunications in 2009
 Corps des ponts, des eaux et des forêts (IPEF)
 Corps des télécommunications, merged into the Corps des mines in 2009
 Corps de l'armement
 Corps de l'INSEE
 Administrateurs des assemblées parlementaires : administrateur de l'Assemblée nationale, administrateur du Sénat
 Grand Administrative Corps of the State, generally recruited through the École nationale d'administration
 Conseil d'État
 Inspection générale des finances.
 Cour des comptes

High-level administrative positions are typically paid much less than the equivalent positions in private industries. However, members of grand Corps often practice pantouflage — that is, they take temporarily (and sometimes permanent) leave from government work and go work in industry. Occasionally, people from a ministry supervising some industry would later go to work in that same industry; this practice was later prohibited. Pantouflage however still exists, and the coziness between some industrial, political and administrative circles is regularly denounced.

Members of the great administrative corps are well represented in politics. This is facilitated by civil servants (of any level) being able to exercise elected office on a temporary leave (détachement) from government.

Duties

Civil servants have duties; failure to carry them out may result in disciplinary action, up to discharge. The main duties are:

Full commitment to professional activity
A civil servant should devote his full professional activity to his appointed task. By exception, a civil servant may in addition to his regular activities write books; he may also accomplish certain tasks (teaching...) with the permission of his hierarchical supervisor.

Morality
One cannot be a civil servant if one has been convicted of a crime incompatible with one's functions.

In certain exceptional cases, certain aspects of the private life of a civil servant may be termed incompatible with his functions. For instance, it is inappropriate for a member of the police or the judiciary to live with a delinquent partner or a prostitute. Appreciation of what is appropriate or not is largely a matter of case law.

Reserve
A civil servant should not, by his actions and especially by his declarations, cause harm to institutions.

Generally speaking, a civil servant should always refrain from enunciating personal opinions in a manner that can be construed as expressing the official opinion of the French government or a public institution. Obviously, this is more of a matter for the higher managerial positions. Agents operating abroad should be especially prudent. For instance, an ambassador should refrain from making any private comment on international issues.

The academic freedom of university professors is a principle recognized (in theory) by the laws of the Republic, as defined by the Constitutional Council; furthermore, statute law declares about higher education that "teachers-researchers [university professors and lecturers], researchers and teachers are fully independent and enjoy full freedom of speech in the course of their research and teaching activities, provided they respect, following university traditions and the dispositions of this code, principles of tolerance and objectivity".

Hierarchical obedience
A civil servant must accomplish the orders given by his hierarchical supervisor, unless those orders are evidently illegal and contrary to public interest.

While the hierarchical authority is normally responsible for assigning civil servants to positions and evaluating their work, certain corps of civil servants follow specific rules regarding the management, evaluation and discipline of their members. For instance, professors and researchers are evaluated by elected committees of their peers. Furthermore, judges of the judiciary (magistrats du siège) as well as administrative magistrates cannot be removed from their position, even for a promotion, without their agreement.

Professional discretion
Civil servants must not reveal private or secret information that they have gained in the course of their duties. Depending on a civil servant's corps, this obligation may be of varying intensity : while administrative magistrates are formally discouraged from making their profession in non-professional works and opinions, members of the military are expected to maintain a very high standard of discretion. This restraint on the side of the military has even led it to being nicknamed "the great mute" ("la grande muette").

Honesty
Civil servants must not use the means at their professional disposal for private gain.

Neutrality
Civil servant must be neutral with respect to the religious or political opinions, origin, or sex, and should refrain from expressing their own opinions.

Recruitment and career
Most positions are open to citizens of the European Union. Certain positions involving the main powers of the state (e.g. Police) are open only to French nationals. Some rare positions, e.g. university professors and researchers, are open regardless of citizenship.

As an exception to the general rules concerning workers, civil servants do not sign contracts; their situation is defined by statutory and regulatory dispositions, most notably the General Statute of the Civil Servants (Statut Général des Fonctionnaires).

The general rule is that civil servants are recruited through competitive exams, either:
 external, reserved to competitors fulfilling certain conditions of diplomas and age;
 internal, reserved to civil servants in certain positions;
 external, reserved to competitors having certain professional experience and age.

The most common method is to organize written and/or oral exams in subjects pertaining to the tasks to be accomplished. For certain positions, such as professorships in universities, the exam, organized locally for each position or each set of similar positions, consists in the submission of a file listing the professional qualifications and experience of the candidate, followed by an interview.
In all cases, a committee ranks candidates by order of preference; the positions are filled by the candidates accepting them called in that order of preference.
For some top managerial positions, nominations are at the discretion of the executive.

High level nominations are made by the President of the Republic in the council of ministers. The rest are by the head of the agency they belong to, or by a minister; in fact, they are in general appointed by some person who has received from the head of agency or minister the authority to do so.

Pay
The pay of a civil servant is composed of:
 a base pay known as traitement
 possible overtime pay
 possible bonuses, which depend on the particular job assignment and possibly of the individual worker.

The traitement is for most civil servants fixed by multiplying an index by the value of the index point in Euros. The value of the index point is set by the executive and is raised regularly to compensate for inflation. The index depends on the corps, rank and seniority in rank (échelon).

In the case of high-level civil servants known as hors échelle, the corps, rank and seniority correspond to a letter code (e.g. A1, E2, G); the corresponding yearly pay can then be looked up in tables set by the executive. For instance, the topmost traitement, corresponding to pay grade G, is €82737.67 per year, starting 1 July 2009.

There are special rules for the pays of elected officials and government ministers.

Statistics
On 31 December 1999, official statistics give for the state civil service:

(1) Including 12,000 young employees on limited time contracts.

See also 
Academic ranks in France
Category:French civil servants

References

External links
 Ministry of the Civil Service